The 2006–07 ACB season was the 24th season of the Liga ACB.  The regular season began on Saturday, September 30, 2006, and ended on Sunday, May 13, 2007. The regular season ended with TAU Cerámica in first place, but Real Madrid won the ACB finals against Wintethur FC Barcelona.

Team standings after 34 games.

|}
|}

Playoffs

Stats Leaders

Points

Rebounds

Assists

See also 
Liga ACB

References

2006-07 ACB Statistics

External links
 ACB.com 
 linguasport.com 

 
Liga ACB seasons
 
Spain